Eosaurichthys is an extinct saurichthyid ray-finned fish that lived during the late Permian epoch (Changhsingian age) in what is now China.  It closely resembles its daughter genus, Saurichthys, in both form and morphology.

Eosaurichthys is often treated as a subgenus of Saurichthys rather than a genus, with its type species referred to as Saurichthys (Eosaurichthys) chaoi. The Early Triassic species Saurichthys madagascariensis has been referred to this subgenus as Saurichthys (Eoaurichthys) madagascariensis.

See also

 Prehistoric fish
 List of prehistoric bony fish

References

Late Permian fish
Saurichthyiformes
Prehistoric animals of China